Akhmed Anarbayev (born 30 May 1948) is a retired USSR swimmer who won a silver medal at the 1970 European Aquatics Championships. He also competed in the 400 m freestyle at the 1968 Summer Olympics but did not reach the finals.

After retiring from senior swimming Anarbayev continued to compete internationally in the masters category. He is also an experienced open water swimmer who crossed Issyk Kul and took part in a crossborder swimming event in the Bering Strait. From 1992 to 1997 he was the President of the Kyrgyz Republic Swimming Federation. He lives in Bishkek, and works in hotel business.

References

External links
 

1948 births
Kyrgyzstani male freestyle swimmers
Living people
Swimmers at the 1968 Summer Olympics
Soviet male freestyle swimmers
Olympic swimmers of the Soviet Union
European Aquatics Championships medalists in swimming
People from Kara-Balta